Raul V. Fabella (born 12 April 1949, Bacolod, Negros Occidental, Philippines) is a Filipino academic, economist and National Scientist of the Philippines. He was born to Estelito Fabella and Magdalena Villaseñor in Bacolod, Negros Occidental. Raul is the grandnephew of Gabriel Fabella, father of June 12th. Raul's grandfather Adriano was Gabriel's brother.

Fabella was educated at the Seminario Mayor-Recoletos (now the Casiciaco Recoletos Seminary, Ph.B. 1970); the University of the Philippines School of Economics at UP Diliman (M.A. 1975).  He obtained his Ph.D. from the Department of Economics of Yale University in 1982 with the dissertation "Economies of Scale in the Household Production Model and Intra-Family Allocation of Resources". His entire academic career has been spent with the faculty of the University of the Philippines School of Economics (UPSE), which he served as dean from 1998 to 2007. 

Fabella has written articles in both theoretical and applied fields: political economy and rent-seeking; the theory of teams; regulation; international economics; and mathematical economics. Notable concepts associated with him are the "Olson ratio" in rent-seeking, egalitarian Nash bargaining solutions, and the debt-adjusted real effective exchange rate.

In public-policy debates he has been a prominent advocate of a policy of currency undervaluation as a tool of development.

Fabella was elected to the National Academy of Science and Technology (NAST) in 1995. Upon endorsement by NAST, he was awarded the title of National Scientist by President Benigno Aquino III on 27 July 2011. The National Scientist title is the highest recognition given by the Philippine Government to a Filipino for his or her outstanding contributions to science and technology.

References

20th-century Filipino economists
1949 births
Living people
Academic staff of the University of the Philippines
People from Bacolod
University of the Philippines Diliman alumni
Yale Graduate School of Arts and Sciences alumni
21st-century Filipino economists
National Scientists of the Philippines